Robert Raymond Packard (July 30, 1916 – December 21, 1980) was an American sprinter. He competed in the men's 200 metres at the 1936 Summer Olympics.

References

1916 births
1980 deaths
Athletes (track and field) at the 1936 Summer Olympics
American male sprinters
Olympic track and field athletes of the United States
Sportspeople from Rockford, Illinois